The women's 100 metres hurdles at the 2014 European Athletics Championships have taken place at the Letzigrund on 12 and 13 August.

Medalists

Records

Schedule

Results

Round 1

First 3 in each heat (Q) and 4 best performers (q) advance to the Semifinals.

Wind:Heat 1: −1.5 m/s, Heat 2: −1.1 m/s, Heat 3: 0.0 m/s, Heat 4: −2.0 m/s

Semifinals

First 3 in each heat (Q) and 2 best performers (q) advance to the Final.

Wind:Heat 1: −0.8 m/s, Heat 2: −0.1 m/s

Final
Wind: −0.7 m/s

References

Hurdles 100 W
Sprint hurdles at the European Athletics Championships
2014 in women's athletics